Enrique 'Kiko' Torres Martín (born 28 October 1975 in Madrid) is a retired Spanish professional footballer who played as a midfielder.

Torres spent the 2001–02 season at Scottish club Dundee after signing for them in December 2001. He scored his first goal for the club in a Scottish Cup tie against Partick Thistle, and his second came in the league against St Johnstone. He was released by the club in the summer of 2002.

References

External links

1975 births
Living people
Footballers from Madrid
Spanish footballers
Association football midfielders
Real Madrid Castilla footballers
Real Valladolid Promesas players
Real Murcia players
CD Tenerife players
Elche CF players
Scottish Premier League players
Dundee F.C. players
Spain youth international footballers
Spanish expatriate footballers
Expatriate footballers in Scotland